Kuh Shah Rural District is a rural district (dehestan) in the Ahmadi District of Hajjiabad County, Hormozgan Province, Iran. At the 2006 census, its population was 5,547, in 1,356 families.  The rural district has 35 villages.

References 

Rural Districts of Hormozgan Province
Hajjiabad County